The Gender Knot: Unraveling our Patriarchal Legacy is a 1997 book by Allan G. Johnson. Johnson explains and addresses the concept of the patriarchy and how it deeply affects the lives of both men and women. He stresses that avoiding "the path of least resistance" is the key to combating gender inequality. He lays out a guide that encourages every person to fight the patriarchy in their life.

Summary  

In The Gender Knot, Allan Johnson explains how the sexism that people experience is a direct result of the patriarchal structure of our society. Johnson also details how the average person helps reinforce the patriarchy by avoiding questioning the status quo. He explains how men directly benefit from patriarchy, and that they must contribute to the feminist movement by addressing their own male privilege. He dissects the phenomenon that men can be both privileged and made to feel powerless by the patriarchy. He uses the Tree of patriarchy as a way to visualize the system of patriarchy. He also criticizes the use of the terms misandry and reverse sexism and the motives of the men's rights movement.

Reception  
Critical reception for The Gender Knot has been positive. Abby L. Ferber, writing for Gender and Society, called The Gender Knot "a unique book that fills a void in the literature on gender." In Off Our Backs, Karla Mantilla called it "a brilliant accounting of patriarchy." In a review for Contemporary Sociology, Rebecca Bach states that Johnson follows the tradition of "the best of feminist theory" in his writing.

References

1997 non-fiction books
Feminist books
Gender studies books
Women's studies